Cec Verrell is an American actress who starred in many television programmes.

Filmography
 2001 Nice Guys Finish Dead as Shauna
 1999 ER - (TV series) (1 episode) as Mrs. Casey
 1999 Air America (1999) - (TV series) (1 episode) as Sandra Casey
 1997 The Price of Kissing as Renee's Mother
 1997 Wings (1997) - (TV series) (1 episode) as Wanda Harrison
 1996 Paihnidi (1996)
 NYPD Blue (1996) - (TV series) (1 episode) as Gail Keller
 1995 M.A.N.T.I.S. (1995) - (TV series) (1 episode) as Dr. Marissa Savoy
 1994 Murder, She Wrote (1994) - (TV series) (1 episode) as Joellen Waller
 1994 The X-Files - (TV series) (episode: Lazarus") as Lula Phillips
 1994 Space Rangers - (TV series) (1 episode) as Ree
 1993 Three of Hearts as Allison
 1992 Perry Mason: The Case of the Heartbroken Bride (TV) as 'Rocky'
 1992 Inside Out III as Susan 'Tango'
 1992 Mad at the Moon as Sally
 1991 Inside Out as Psychiatrist
 1991 Death Dreams as Denise Massell
 1990 Super Force - (TV series) as Patty Pretty
 1989 Matlock - (TV series) (1 episode) as Sheila Carver
 1989 Nick Knight (TV) as Janette
 1988 Transformations as Antonia
 1988 Supercarrier Lieutenant Ruth 'Bee Bee' Ruthkowski
 1988 Hell Comes to Frogtown as Centinella
 1988 Cheers (1988) (TV series) (1 episode) as Jennifer McCall
 1987 Stingray (TV series) (1 episode) - DEA Agent Barbara
 1987 Eye of the Eagle as Chris Chandler
 1988-1989 Hunter: City Under Siege as Iris Smith
 1986 L.A. Law (TV series) (3 episodes) as Angela Cipriano
 1986 Silk as Jenny Sleighton
 1986 Hollywood Vice Squad as Judy
 1986 Hardesty House as April
 1984 Runaway'' as Hooker

References

External links
 

Living people
American television actresses
21st-century American women
1958 births